Centipede is the debut album by American singer Rebbie Jackson. Released by Columbia Records in the fall of 1984, the album spawned two top-forty Billboard charting hits, the most famous being the title track.

Background
Despite having worked with her family on The Jacksons variety TV show and having been a backing singer for the likes of Betty Wright in the late 70's, Jackson was the last Jackson family sibling to release an album at the age of 34, mostly due to wanting to raise her two young daughters, Stacee and Yashi, in a secure family environment, waiting until she felt they were old enough.

The recording of the album was a family affair, as her brother Michael Jackson wrote, produced and sang backing vocals on the title track. Brothers Marlon, Jackie, Tito and Randy co-wrote "Come Alive It's Saturday Night", with the latter two producing the song as well. Tito also co-wrote "Hey Boy" with his wife, the late Delores "Dee Dee" Martes. The rest of the album was produced by Wayne Henderson.

The album includes two covers, The Miracles' "A Fork in the Road" and Prince's "I Feel for You". Chaka Khan, who earned a #1 hit with her well-known cover of the latter song, released it as a single a mere week before Jackson's album was released.

Three singles were released from the album. The title track, "Centipede" was released as the lead single in September 1984 and eventually became Jackson's biggest hit and best known song, peaking at #4 on the Billboard R&B chart and at #24 on the Billboard Hot 100, becoming the artist's highest charting hit on both charts to date. It eventually received a Gold disc certification by the RIAA. The song also featured additional background vocals by The Weather Girls. The next two singles were released in early 1985, but failed to replicate the single's success, with the ballad "A Fork in the Road" peaking at #40 on the R&B chart, and the third and last single, a remixed version of "Play Me (I'm a Jukebox)" (co-written by country artist Pam Tillis) not charting at all.

The album itself had moderate success, peaking at #63 on the Billboard 200, and achieving a respectable #13 peak on the Top R&B/Hip Hop Albums chart. Again, they became the singer's highest chart positions on both charts to date.

Centipede was not released on the then-new CD format at the time, and remained out of print for several years. It received a limited first CD edition in 1999. On May 25, 2010, the album was reissued on CD, also containing Jackson's follow-up album, Reaction.

In September 2012, the album was reissued by label Funky Town Grooves, who specializes on reissuing 1980's R&B albums, with the inclusion of 7 bonus tracks, including the b-side "Eternal Love" and a previously unreleased track from those sessions co-written by her brothers Marlon, Jackie, Tito and Randy, titled "I'm Just Gonna Love You", as well as remixes.

Centipede is mentioned in the 2006 RuPaul song "Supermodel (El Lay Toya Jam)" from the album ReWorked.

Track listing

Expanded edition

Personnel
Rebbie Jackson - vocals
David Williams, Charles Fearing - guitar
Nathan East, Nathaniel Phillips - bass
Frank "Rusty" Hamilton - Moog bass, keyboards, synthesizer
Randy Jackson, Bobby Lyle, John Springer - keyboards
Nick Johnson, John Barnes - synthesizer
Mike Hightower - DMX programmer
Leon "Ndugu" Chancler, Alvino Bennett - drums
Jerry Hey - flugelhorn
Michael Jackson, The Weather Girls (Izora Armstead, Martha Wash), Randy Jackson, Tito Jackson, Gwen Matthews, Marlena Jeter, Maxi Anderson, Garry Glenn, Patryce Banks, John Springer - backing vocals

Charts

References

Rebbie Jackson albums
1984 debut albums
Columbia Records albums
Albums produced by Michael Jackson
Albums produced by Wayne Henderson (musician)